Echo Hill Ranch is a summer ranch camp of about 400 acres (1.6 km2) in the Texas Hill Country. The ranch was founded in 1953 by Dr. S. Thomas Friedman and Minnie Samet Friedman. It is located south of Kerrville near Medina. Echo Hill was founded as a noncompetitive, child-centered ranch camp for boys and girls ages 6–14.  Echo Hill Ranch is the current residence of Texas musician/writer/gubernatorial candidate Kinky Friedman. July 24, 2013 the camp announced via their Facebook page that it would not reopen for summer of 2014.

References

External links

Summer camps in Texas
Companies based in Texas
Buildings and structures in Kerr County, Texas
American companies established in 1953
1953 establishments in Texas